Khosrowabad (also Romanized as Khosrowābād; also known as Khosrābād and Khusrābād) is a village in Fakhrud Rural District, Qohestan District, Darmian County, South Khorasan Province, Iran. At the 2006 census, its population was 431, in 135 families.

References 

Populated places in Darmian County